The Killsnake River is a  river in eastern Wisconsin in the United States. It is a tributary of the South Branch of the Manitowoc River, which flows to Lake Michigan.

The river flows for its entire course in central Calumet County.

Killsnake Wildlife Area

The  surrounding the confluence of the Killsnake River with the South Branch Manitowoc River has been designated a wildlife refuge by the Wisconsin Department of Natural Resources. The area is located entirely in the town of Rantoul.

Registered historic area
There are four archaeological sites ranging from a major Early Paleo-Indian campsite from 9000 BC to a Potawatomi village from the mid-19th century AD located in the wildlife area, and the site is listed on the National Register of Historic Places.

See also
List of Wisconsin rivers

Sources

External links
Killsnake Wildlife Area - Wisconsin DNR
DeLorme (1992).  Wisconsin Atlas & Gazetteer.  Freeport, Maine: DeLorme.  .

Rivers of Wisconsin
Rivers of Calumet County, Wisconsin
Archaeological sites on the National Register of Historic Places in Wisconsin
State Wildlife Areas of Wisconsin
Protected areas of Calumet County, Wisconsin
National Register of Historic Places in Calumet County, Wisconsin